(2Z,4Z,6Z,8Z)-Thionine or Thionine is an unsaturated heterocycle of nine atoms, with a sulfur replacing a carbon at one position.  Thionine is a partially aromatic compound.

See also
 Azonine
 Thiepine
 Cyclononatetraene
 Thiophene
 Oxonine

References

Sulfur heterocycles
Simple aromatic rings
Heterocyclic compounds with 1 ring
Nine-membered rings